Anagrina is a genus of African long-spinneret ground spiders that was first described by Lucien Berland in 1920.  it contains only two species, found only in Africa: A. alticola and A. nigritibialis.

See also
 List of Prodidominae species

References

Araneomorphae genera
Prodidominae
Taxa named by Lucien Berland